The Territory of Utah was an organized incorporated territory of the United States that existed from September 9, 1850, until January 4, 1896, when the final extent of the territory was admitted to the Union as the State of Utah, the 45th state.  At its creation, the Territory of Utah included all of the present-day State of Utah, most of the present-day state of Nevada save for Southern Nevada (including Las Vegas), much of present-day western Colorado, and the extreme southwest corner of present-day Wyoming.

History

The territory was organized by an Organic Act of Congress in 1850, on the same day that the State of California was admitted to the Union and the New Mexico Territory was added for the southern portion of the former Mexican land. The creation of the territory was part of the Compromise of 1850 that sought to preserve the balance of power between slave and free states. With the exception of a small area around the headwaters of the Colorado River in present-day Colorado, the United States had acquired all the land of the territory from Mexico with the Treaty of Guadalupe Hidalgo of 1848. After passing the Senate, the House of Representatives voted in favor of organizing the Territory of Utah, 97–85.

The creation of the Utah Territory was partially the result of the petition sent by the Mormon pioneers who had settled in the valley of the Great Salt Lake starting in 1847. The Mormons, under the leadership of Brigham Young, had petitioned Congress for entry into the Union as the State of Deseret, with its capital as Salt Lake City and with proposed borders that encompassed the entire Great Basin and the watershed of the Colorado River, including all or part of nine current U.S. states. The Mormon settlers had drafted a state constitution in 1849 and Deseret had become the de facto government in the Great Basin by the time of the creation of the Utah Territory.

Following the organization of the territory, Young was inaugurated as its first governor on February 3, 1851. In the first session of the territorial legislature in September, the legislature adopted all the laws and ordinances previously enacted by the General Assembly of the State of Deseret.

During Brigham Young's governorship, he exerted considerable power over the territory. An example being that in 1873, the territory legislature gave Young the exclusive right to manufacture whiskey.

Mormon governance in the territory was regarded as controversial by much of the rest of the nation, partly fed by continuing lurid newspaper depictions of the polygamy practiced by the settlers, which itself had been part of the cause of their flight from the United States to the Great Salt Lake basin after being forcibly removed from their settlements farther east.

Although the Mormons were the majority in the Great Salt Lake basin, the western area of the territory began to attract many non-Mormon settlers, especially after the discovery of silver at the Comstock Lode in 1858. In 1861, partly as a result of this, the Nevada Territory was created out of the western part of the territory.  Non-Mormons also entered the easternmost part of the territory during the Pikes Peak Gold Rush, resulting in the discovery of gold at Breckenridge in Utah Territory in 1859.  In 1861 a large portion of the eastern area of the territory was reorganized as part of the newly created Colorado Territory.

In 1869 the territory approved and ratified women's suffrage.

The controversies stirred by the Mormon religion's dominance of the territory are regarded as the primary reason behind the long delay of 46 years between the organization of the territory and its admission to the Union in 1896 as the State of Utah, long after the admission of territories created after it. In contrast, the Nevada Territory, although more sparsely populated, was admitted to the Union in 1864, only three years after its formation, largely as a consequence of the Union's desire to consolidate its hold on the silver mines in the territory. Colorado was admitted in 1876.

Coat of arms
The Utah state coat of arms appears on the state seal and state flag. The beehive was chosen as the emblem for the provisional State of Deseret in 1848 and represents the state's industrious and hard-working inhabitants, and the virtues of thrift and perseverance. The sego lilies on either side symbolize peace.

See also

Historic regions of the United States
History of Utah
Territorial evolution of the United States

References

Further reading
 Unpopular Sovereignty: Mormons and the Federal Management of Early Utah Territory by Brent M. Rogers, 2017, University of Nebraska Press

External links

 Utah in 1851, with the text of the 1850 Act of Congress to Establish the Territory of Utah, Central Pacific Railroad Photographic History Museum
 Utah's Role in the Transcontinental Railroad, Central Pacific Railroad Photographic History Museum
 Utah State History  Utah Office of Tourism Official Website
 Henry Sommer, Watercolors and Pencil Drawings Related to the Utah Expedition. Yale Collection of Western Americana, Beinecke Rare Book and Manuscript Library.

 
Former organized territories of the United States
History of the American West
History of the Great Basin
19th century in Utah
Pre-statehood history of Colorado
Pre-statehood history of Nevada
Territory
Pre-statehood history of Wyoming
Utah War
States and territories established in 1850
States and territories disestablished in 1896
1850 establishments in Utah Territory
1896 disestablishments in Utah Territory